Kemal Pasha usually refers to Mustafa Kemal Atatürk (1881–1938), founder of the Republic of Turkey

Kemal Pasha may also refer to:
 Kemalpaşa, a town and district in İzmir Province, Turkey
 Kemalpaşa, Artvin, a town and district in Artvin Province, Turkey
 Kemal Pasha dessert
 Mustafakemalpaşa, a town and district in Bursa Province, Turkey